Kairat Ashirbekov is a Kazakhstani football official and a former player. He works as a sporting director for FC Ordabasy.

International career
His national team debut was on 7 July 2006 against Tajikistan in a friendly match.

Career statistics

Club statistics
Last update: 10 February 2009

International goals

References

External links

 Profile at club website

1982 births
Living people
Association football midfielders
Kazakhstani footballers
Kazakhstan international footballers
Kazakhstan Premier League players
FC Astana players
FC Aktobe players
FC Shakhter Karagandy players
FC Taraz players
FC Ordabasy players
People from Shymkent